The 2019 South Carolina Gamecocks baseball team represented the University of South Carolina in the 2019 NCAA Division I baseball season. The Gamecocks played their home games at Founders Park.

Preseason

Preseason All-American teams

2nd Team
Noah Campbell – Second Baseman (Baseball America)

SEC media poll
The SEC media poll was released on February 7, 2019 with the Gamecocks predicted to finish in fourth place in the Eastern Division.

Preseason All-SEC teams

1st Team
Noah Campbell – Second Baseman

Roster

Schedule and results

Schedule Source:
*Rankings are based on the team's current ranking in the D1Baseball poll.

Record vs. conference opponents

Rankings

2019 MLB draft

References

South Carolina
South Carolina Gamecocks baseball seasons
South Carolina Gamecocks baseball